Too Much, Too Little, Too Late was a 1998 EP and single by the British power pop band Silver Sun.  The title track was a cover of the John Vallins song that was US #1 hit for Johnny Mathis and Deniece Williams.  It was the biggest commercial success to date for the band reaching #20 in the UK Singles Chart.

The B-side of the single and the two bonus tracks on the CD version were also cover versions: "Xanadu" was originally by Rush, "You Made Me Realise" was by My Bloody Valentine and "I'm a Dick" was originally by The Muffs.


Track listing

7-inch single, cassette
"Too Much, Too Little, Too Late" (N.Kipner, J.Vallins) – 3:43
"Xanadu" (Geddy Lee, Alex Lifeson & Neil Peart) – 4:02

CD single
"Too Much, Too Little, Too Late" (N.Kipner, J.Vallins) – 3:43
"Xanadu" (Geddy Lee, Alex Lifeson & Neil Peart) – 4:02
"You Made Me Realise" (Kevin Shields) – 3:26
"I'm a Dick" (Kim Shattuck) – 1:40

Personnel
James Broad - lead vocals, electric/acoustic guitars
Paul Smith - electric guitar, piano
Richard Kane - bass, electric guitar, percussion, backing vocals, Moog, autoharp
Richard Sayce - drums, percussion, vocals
Al Clay - producer

References

Silver Sun albums
1998 EPs